Table tennis at the 2015 Pacific Games in Port Moresby, Papua New Guinea was held on July 3–10, 2015. The competition included four parasport events: Men's singles – seated,  women's singles – seated, men's singles – ambulatory, and women's singles – ambulatory. Tahiti dominated the competition, winning seven of the eleven gold medals on offer.

Medal summary

Medal table

Men's

Women's

Mixed

See also
 Table tennis at the Pacific Games

References

2015 Pacific Games
Pacific Games
2015